The  is a class of destroyer, serving with the Japan Maritime Self-Defense Force (JMSDF). It was the first class of first generation of general-purpose destroyers of the JMSDF.

Background
Destroyers of the JMSDF had been divided into two series, anti-aircraft gunfire-oriented destroyers (DDA) and ASW-oriented destroyers (DDK). However, in the 1970s, a drastic review of the fleet became necessary due to the enhancement of the Soviet submarine fleet and the reinforcement of the anti-ship missiles. After consideration by Operations research, the concept of eight ships / eight helicopters was adopted as a new fleet organization. In this concept, each flotillas would be composed of one helicopter destroyer (DDH), five general-purpose destroyers (DD), and two guided-missile destroyers (DDG).

 are a new type of destroyers for this concept, combining the anti-aircraft capability of the DDA and the anti-submarine capability of the DDK, while also capable of operating missiles and helicopters. This was the first class to be built based on this concept.

Design

The shape under the water line resembles . In order to reduce noise, Prairie-Masker was installed after the 3rd ship and was retrofitted to the 1st and 2nd ships at a later date.

From DD-129 onward, steel replaced aluminium for key elements of the superstructure including the bridge to improve resistance and durability. However, due to this design change, ballast had to be installed, the classes displacement increased and the maneuvering performance deteriorated.

It was the first class to use combined gas or gas (COGOG) propulsion system in the JMSDF. The all-gas-turbine propulsion system is composed of two Kawasaki-Rolls-Royce Tyne RM1C gas turbines for cruising and two Kawasaki-Rolls-Royce Olympus TM3B gas turbines for high-speed operation.

This combination and mounting method of these engines are similar to the Type 21 frigates of the British Royal Navy, so it was not possible to adopt an alternating engine room arrangement like a conventional JMSDF destroyer, the lack of redundancy was pointed out.

Equipment
The core of the combat system is the OYQ-5 Tactical Data Processing System (TDPS), composed of one AN/UYK-20 computer and five OJ-194B workstations and capable of receiving data automatically from other ships via Link-14 (STANAG 5514).

This is the first destroyer class in the JMSDF equipped with the Sea Sparrow Improved basic point defense missile system. The IBPDMS of this class uses FCS-2 fire-control systems of Japanese make and one octuple launcher at the afterdeck. And in the JMSDF, OTO Melara 76 mm compact gun and Boeing Harpoon surface-to-surface missile are adopted from the ship of FY1977 including this class. Also, ships built in FY1979 and beyond carried Phalanx CIWS and were retrofitted to previous ships.

This class introduced the capability of shipboard helicopter operations. While the JMSDF already had the  "helicopter destroyer", the Hatsuyuki class were the first air-capable general purpose destroyer class. Although it has a small aviation deck, through a beartrap system, the class can operate the Mitsubishi HSS-2B anti-submarine helicopter safely in a wider range of weather conditions. Later, HSS-2B was replaced by Mitsubishi SH-60J, but there was no room to install a large data link device for SH-60J, so a simplified type was installed.

They were initially planned to carry out passive operation with sonobuoys laid by helicopters and towed array sonar (TASS) as sensors, but because the development of TASS was delayed, they was retrofitted later on only four ships. OQS-4 hull sonar was the Japanese equivalent of American AN/SQS-56, and OQR-1 TASS was of AN/SQR-19.

Sub-class

Four ships of this class have been re-purposed as training vessels: JS Shimayuki (1999), JS Shirayuki (2011), JS Setoyuki (2012) and JS Yamayuki (2016). These ships have been converted for training, yet they still have their weapons systems intact. They are referenced after the lead ship as the: ''Shimayuki''-class.

Ships in the class

References

Books

External links

JMSDF DD Hatsuyuki Class

Destroyer classes
 
Auxiliary training ship classes